Voltolino Fontani (1920 in Livorno, Italia – 1976) was an Italian painter.

Header
He was an artist who contributed to introduce the expression Atomic age in the European culture. He was the founder of Eaismo, an artistic movement linking arts to Atomic age.

In 1948, he published “Manifesto of Eaismo”, anticipating the Manifesto of Pittura nucleare  by  Enrico Baj (1951), and Salvador Dalí (Manifesto mistico, 1951).

References

Bibliography
Carlo Emanuele Bugatti, Voltolino Fontani, Bugatti editore, Ancona, 1972

External links
:it:Pittura Nucleare The Italian page for the arte nucleare

1920 births
1976 deaths
20th-century Italian painters
20th-century Italian male artists
Italian male painters
People from Livorno